Dunbarton is a town in Merrimack County, New Hampshire, United States. The population was 3,005 at the 2020 census, up from 2,758 at the 2010 census.

History 
Originally granted as "Gorham's-town" in 1735, and re-granted as "Starkstown" in 1748, the town was incorporated in 1765 as Dunbarton. The name came from Dunbartonshire in Scotland, hometown to Archibald Stark, a prominent settler.

Geography 
The town is drained to the northeast by tributaries of the Turkey River, to the southeast by Black Brook and its tributaries, and to the west by tributaries of the Piscataquog River. The entire town is within the Merrimack River watershed.

The town claims to be the location of the geographic center of New England, based on a Boston University calculation from 2008.

Adjacent municipalities 
 Bow (northeast)
 Hooksett (east)
 Goffstown (south)
 Weare (west)
 Hopkinton (north)

Demographics 

As of the census of 2000, there were 2,226 people, 814 households, and 648 families residing in the town.  The population density was 72.1 people per square mile (27.8/km2).  There were 858 housing units at an average density of 27.8 per square mile (10.7/km2).  The racial makeup of the town was 98.43% White, 0.09% African American, 0.45% Native American, 0.45% Asian, 0.04% from other races, and 0.54% from two or more races. Hispanic or Latino of any race were 0.31% of the population.

There were 814 households, out of which 39.6% had children under the age of 18 living with them, 73.8% were married couples living together, 3.6% had a female householder with no husband present, and 20.3% were non-families. 14.1% of all households were made up of individuals, and 3.2% had someone living alone who was 65 years of age or older.  The average household size was 2.73 and the average family size was 3.03.

In the town, the population was spread out, with 27.5% under the age of 18, 4.0% from 18 to 24, 34.8% from 25 to 44, 26.6% from 45 to 64, and 7.1% who were 65 years of age or older.  The median age was 38 years. For every 100 females, there were 102.4 males.  For every 100 females age 18 and over, there were 102.6 males.

The median income for a household in the town was $65,081, and the median income for a family was $67,448. Males had a median income of $46,042 versus $31,641 for females. The per capita income for the town was $27,892.  About 2.3% of families and 2.8% of the population were below the poverty line, including 2.4% of those under age 18 and 4.9% of those age 65 or over.

Notable people 

 Robert Lowell (1917–1977), poet; buried in Stark Cemetery
 John Ordway (1775–1817), sergeant in the Corps of Discovery, helped lead the Lewis and Clark Expedition
 Robert Rogers (1731–1795), commander of Rogers' Rangers during the French and Indian War; American-born traitor that served in the British army during the American Revolution
 Caleb Stark (1759–1838), New Hampshire state senator; eldest son of General John Stark and his wife Molly Stark
 John Stark (1728–1822), New Hampshire native who served as an officer in the British Army during the French and Indian war and a major general in the Continental Army during the American Revolution; known as the "Hero of Bennington" for his exemplary service at the Battle of Bennington in 1777
 Molly Stark (1737–1814), wife of General John Stark, made famous by his battle cry during the American Revolutionary War; described as "mother of 11 children, homemaker, patriot, and defender of the household"

References

External links 
 
 New Hampshire Economic and Labor Market Information Bureau Profile

Scottish-American culture in New Hampshire
Towns in Merrimack County, New Hampshire
Towns in New Hampshire